Craig Moore (born 1975) is an Australian soccer player.

Craig Moore may also refer to:

Craig Moore (footballer, born 1994), Scottish footballer (Motherwell FC)
Craig Moore (footballer, born 2005), Scottish footballer (Dundee United FC)
Craig Moore (musician), American rock musician, member of GONN
Craig Moore (basketball) (born 1987), American basketball player
Craig Moore (baseball), American baseball coach and shortstop